This is chronological list of action films released before the 1970s. Often there may be considerable overlap particularly between action and other genres (including horror, comedy, and science fiction films); the list should attempt to document films which are more closely related to action, even if they bend genres.

Action films are generally considered a post-Classical Hollywood film genre. Additions to this category before the 1970s should be used sparingly, and films before the 1960s are not to be included.

See also
 Action films
 Martial arts films
 Swashbuckler films
 Western films

Notes

 
1960s
Action